The 2018 FAO Super Cup was the inaugural edition of the FAO Super Cup, the main club knockout football competition of Odisha, India. The competition began on 2 October 2018 and concluded with the final on 7 October2018. The entire tournament took place at one venue i.e. the Barabati Stadium in Cuttack.

The competition features teams from the Silver, Gold and Diamond competitions of the FAO League, the premier state level football league in Odisha, India. The top four teams from the Diamond League, top three from Silver League, and the winners of the Silver League qualify for the tournament.

Teams
A total of 8 teams participated in the competition. Sunrise Club emerged as the champions whereas beating Rising Student's Club 2–1 in the final.

Dates
On 9 May 2018, the Football Association of Odisha announced the schedule and full format of the tournament.

Quarter-finals

Semi-finals

Final
The final was played on 7 October 2018 at the Barabati Stadium and Sunrise won the inaugural Super Cup by defeating Rising Student's in the final.

Goalscorers
2 goals
  Arbind Lakra (Rising Student's)
  Gurpreet Singh (Sunrise)
  Lakhai Murmu (Rising Student's)
  Md. Fayaz KF (Sunrise)
  Sheikh Farid (Rising Student's)

1 goal
  Arunangas Gupta (Rovers)
  Chandra Sekhar Behera (Rising Student's)
  Raju Bisar (Rising Student's)
  Dinesh Lakra (Sunrise)
  Manjit Kissan (Sports Hostel)
  Mukesh Bhoi (Sunrise)
  Rakesh Sahoo (Young Utkal)
  Sumit Oram (Rovers)

See also
 2018 FAO League
 FAO League
 FAO Super Cup
 FAO Women's League
 Football Association of Odisha
 Odisha football team
 Odisha women's football team

References

2017–18 in Indian football
FAO Super Cup